The Men's points race at the 2013 UCI Track Cycling World Championships was held on February 22. 19 athletes participated in the contest.

Medalists

Results
The race was held at 20:15.

References

2013 UCI Track Cycling World Championships
UCI Track Cycling World Championships – Men's points race